"Phorever People" is a song by Scottish electronic dance music band the Shamen. It features vocals by singer Jhelisa Anderson and was released in December 1992 as a single from their fifth album, Boss Drum (1992). The single topped the US Billboard Hot Dance Club Play chart and was another hit for the group in the UK, going to number five on the UK Singles Chart. It also became a top-10 hit in Denmark and Ireland, while reaching the top 20 in Austria, Finland, France and Sweden.

Critical reception
Larry Flick from Billboard described the song as "an exercise in chart-smart techno, trance, and house vibes." In their review of the Boss Drum album, Melody Maker wrote that "Phorever People" "would make an ideal next single", remarking that it's "actually sharper single material" than the "awful" "Ebeneezer Goode".

Music video
A music video, directed by British director Richard Heslop, was made to accompany the song.

Track listings

 CD maxi, Germany and UK
 "Phorever People" (Beatmasters East of the Nile Mix) — 6:35
 "Phorever People" (Tee's Flying Dub) — 8:41
 "Phorever People" (D's Mellow Dub) — 4:52
 "Phorever People" (Mk Mix) — 7:44
 "Phorever People" (Kevin Sauderson Technological Dub) — 4:55
 "Phorever People" (Shamen Dub) — 3:56

 CD maxi, Germany and Denmark
 "Phorever People" (Beatmasters Heavenly Edit) — 3:47
 "Phorever People" (Shamen Mix) — 4:55
 "Phorever People" (Shamen Dub) — 3:56
 "Phorever People" (Beatmasters Heavenly Mix) — 6:05

 CD single
 "Phorever People" (Beatmasters East of the Nile Mix) — 6:35
 "Phorever People" (Tee's Flying Dub) — 8:41
 "Phorever People" (D's Flying Dub) — 4:52
 "Phorever People" (Mk Mix) — 7:44

 7-inch and cassette single
 "Phorever People" (Beatmasters Heavenly Edit)
 "Phorever People" (Shamen Mix)
 "Phorever People" (Shamen Dub)
 "Hyperreal Orbit"

 12-inch maxi, Denmark and UK
 "Phorever People" (Beatmasters East Of The Nile Mix)
 "Phorever People" (Tee's Flying Dub)
 "Phorever People" (D's Mellow Dub)
 "Phorever People" (MK Mix)
 "Phorever People" (Kevin Saunderson Technological Dub)

 12-inch maxi, France
 "Phorever People" (Beatmasters Heavenly Mix) — 6:05
 "Phorever People" (Shamen Mix) — 5:52
 "Phorever People" (Beatmasters East Of The Nile Mix) — 6:05
 "Phorever People" (Shamen Dub) — 3:53

 12-inch maxi, Italy
 "Phorever People" (Beatmasters East Of The Nile Mix)
 "Phorever People" (Tee's Flying Dub)
 "Phorever People" (D's Mellow Dub)
 "Phorever People" (MK Mix)
 "Phorever People" (Kevin Saunderson Technological Dub)
 "Phorever People" (Shamen Dub)

 2 x 12-inch maxi
 "Phorever People" (Beatmasters Heavenly Mix)
 "Phorever People" (Beatmasters East Of The Nile Mix)
 "Phorever People" (Shamen Dub)
 "Phorever People" (D's Pat Mix)
 "Phorever People" (Tommy D's Swing Dub)
 "Phorever People" (Tommy D's Joy Making Dub)
 "Phorever People" (Tee's Flying Dub)
 "Phorever People" (Todd's Urban Club)
 "Phorever People" (Todd's Instrumental)
 "Phorever People" (Mk Mix)
 "Phorever People" (Kevin Saundersons Technological Dub)

Charts and certifications

Weekly charts

Year-end charts

Certifications

References

1992 singles
1992 songs
Music videos directed by Richard Heslop
One Little Indian Records singles
Rough Trade Records singles
The Shamen songs
Virgin Records singles